The Silvies River flows for about  through Grant and Harney counties in the U.S. state of Oregon. The river drains  of the northern Harney Basin.

Named tributaries include Bear Creek and Emigrant Creek. The Silvies runs generally southward and passes near Seneca and Burns. Southeast of Burns, in Harney County, the river splits into two distributaries, the East Fork Silvies River and the West Fork Silvies River.

Flowing mainly through private land with limited public access, the river supports populations of redband trout, especially on its upstream reaches. Downstream of Seneca, fish such as smallmouth bass, yellow perch, and carp are more abundant.

See also
 List of rivers of Oregon
 List of longest streams of Oregon
 Malheur National Wildlife Refuge

References

Works cited
 Sheehan, Madelynne Diness (2005). Fishing in Oregon: The Complete Oregon Fishing Guide, 10th edition. Scappoose, Oregon: Flying Pencil Publications. .

External links
 U.S. Army Corps of Engineers photo gallery of Silvies River

Rivers of Oregon
Rivers of Harney County, Oregon
Rivers of Grant County, Oregon
Rivers of the Great Basin